A special election was held in  December 27–29, 1799 to fill a vacancy left by the death of Jonathan N. Havens (DR) on October 25, 1799.

Election results

See also 
 United States House of Representatives elections, 1798 and 1799

References 

New York 1799 01
New York 1799 01
1799 01
New York 01
United States House of Representatives 01
United States House of Representatives 1799 01